The CINAR scandal was a major accounting scandal in Canada that came to light in March 2000 at CINAR, renamed to Cookie Jar Group, one of the world's most successful children's television production companies at the time. It was exposed when investigators revealed that  was invested into Bahamian bank accounts without the board members' approval. The scandal resulted in Canada's longest criminal trial ever brought before a jury.

The company was subsequently renamed Cookie Jar.

Background
CINAR was founded by the husband and wife team of Micheline Charest and Ronald Weinberg in 1976 in New York City after organizing an event for a women's film festival, and later moved its operations to Montreal, Quebec. Throughout the 1980s and 1990s, the company saw massive success with children's programming such as Papa Beaver's Storytime, The Busy World of Richard Scarry, Nickelodeon's Are You Afraid of the Dark?, The Adventures of Paddington Bear, Caillou, Zoboomafoo and Arthur. 

CINAR went public on the Toronto Stock Exchange in 1993, and then on the Nasdaq one year later. In 1996, CINAR acquired the library of the British animation studio FilmFair, which included television adaptations of Paddington Bear. CINAR shut down the studio in 1998. In February 1999, CINAR acquired the film library of Leucadia Film Corporation.

Scandal
The company collapsed in 2001, when an internal audit revealed  was invested into Bahamian bank accounts without the board members' approval. CINAR had also paid American screenwriters for work while continuing to accept federal grants and tax credits for the production of domestic content, although the names of Canadian citizens (generally non-writers connected to CINAR, including Charest's sister Helene) were credited for their work. 

The value of CINAR's stock plummeted, and the company was soon delisted.

There was some speculation that CINAR's CFO Hasanain Panju was the mastermind behind the investment scheme. Other individuals believed to have helped with the scheme include John Xanthoudakis of Norshield Investment Group and Lino Matteo of Mount Real Corporation. It was alleged that Charest and Weinberg (and later Panju) used CINAR as a personal 'piggy bank' and schemed to transfer funds out from the company to the Bahamas through a series of complicated transactions to their own offshore holding companies.

In 2001, Charest and Weinberg agreed to pay $1 million each, and were fired from the company's board of directors.

Aftermath
On August 26, 2009, in a separate case, the Superior Court of Quebec ruled that CINAR had plagiarized the work of Claude Robinson for its animated series Robinson Sucroe. The series was based on a concept he had pitched to CINAR in 1986, but had been turned down. Robinson was awarded $5.2 million in damages, in a suit that resolved a 14-year dispute between the two parties.

On March 10, 2011, co-founder Ronald A. Weinberg returned to Montreal from vacationing in the Caribbean islands and was promptly arrested for securities fraud after a warrant was issued for him to be taken into custody earlier that month.

On January 17, 2014, former CFO Hasanain Panju pleaded guilty to undisclosed crimes. The judge noted these crimes were "disgraceful" and placed a publication ban on details surrounding the trial. Panju was sentenced to four years in prison.

On May 12, 2014, Weinberg, John Xanthoudakis of Norshield Financial Group and Lino Matteo of Mount Real Corp. were charged with 26 counts of fraud in Montreal Superior Court. They were convicted on most of the counts on June 2, 2016, and in the trial Panju acted as a key Crown witness. On June 22, 2016, Weinberg was sentenced to 8 years and 11 months in prison, and the other two received sentences of 7 years and 11 months each. On May 3, 2019, Weinberg was fully paroled.

The CINAR affair was described thus by The Globe and Mail:

References

Accounting scandals
2000 in Quebec
2000s in Montreal
2000 in economics
2000 scandals
2000s economic history
Corporate scandals
Corporate crime
Crime in Montreal
Finance fraud
Fraud in Canada
Scandals in Canada

WildBrain